A gnome  is a mythological creature and diminutive spirit in Renaissance magic and alchemy, first introduced by Paracelsus in the 16th century and later adopted by authors including those of modern fantasy literature. Typically small humanoids who live underground, their characteristics are reinterpreted to suit various storytellers and artists. 

Diminutive statues of gnomes introduced as lawn ornaments during the 19th century grew in popularity during the 20th century and came to be known as garden gnomes.

History

Origins
The word comes from Renaissance Latin gnomus, which first appears in A Book on Nymphs, Sylphs, Pygmies, and Salamanders, and on the Other Spirits by Paracelsus, published posthumously in Nysa in 1566 (and again in the Johannes Huser edition of 1589–1591 from an autograph by Paracelsus).

The term may be an original invention of Paracelsus, possibly deriving the term from Latin gēnomos (itself representing a Greek , approximately "gē-nomos", literally "earth-dweller"). In this case, the omission of the ē is referred to as a blunder by the Oxford English Dictionary (OED). Paracelsus uses Gnomi as a synonym of Pygmæi and classifies them as earth elementals. He describes them as two spans high, very reluctant to interact with humans, and able to move through solid earth as easily as humans move through air.

The chthonic or earth-dwelling spirit has precedents in numerous ancient and medieval mythologies, often guarding mines and precious underground treasures, notably in the Germanic dwarfs and the Greek Chalybes, Telchines or Dactyls. The gnomes of Swiss folklore follow this template, as they are said to have caused the landslide that destroyed the Swiss village of Plurs in 1618 - the villagers had become wealthy from a local gold mine created by the gnomes, who poured liquid gold down into a vein for the benefit of humans, and were  corrupted by this newfound prosperity, which greatly offended the gnomes.

Cultural references

In Romanticism and modern fairy tales

The English word is attested from the early 18th century. Gnomes are used in Alexander Pope's "The Rape of the Lock". The creatures from this mock-epic are small, celestial creatures which were prudish women in their past lives, and now spend all of eternity looking out for prudish women (in parallel to the guardian angels in Catholic belief). Other uses of the term gnome remain obscure until the early 19th century, when it is taken up by authors of Romanticist collections of fairy tales and becomes mostly synonymous with the older word goblin.

Pope's stated source, the 1670 French satire Comte de Gabalis by Nicolas-Pierre-Henri de Montfaucon de Villars, the abbot of Villars,  describes gnomes as such:
"The Earth is filled almost to the center with Gnomes or Pharyes, a people of small stature, the guardians of treasures, of mines, and of precious stones. They are ingenious, friends of men, and easie (sic) to be commandded (sic). They furnish the children of the Sages with as much money, as they have need of; and never ask any other reward of their services, than the glory of being commanded. The Gnomides or wives of these Gnomes or Pharyes, are little, but very handsom (sic); and their habit marvellously (sic) curious."
De Villars used the term gnomide to refer to female gnomes (often "gnomid" in English translations). Modern fiction instead uses the word "gnomess" to refer to female gnomes.

In 19th-century fiction, the chthonic gnome became a sort of antithesis to the more airy or luminous fairy. Nathaniel Hawthorne in Twice-Told Tales (1837) contrasts the two in "Small enough to be king of the fairies, and ugly enough to be king of the gnomes" (cited after OED). Similarly, gnomes are contrasted to elves, as in William Cullen Bryant's Little People of the Snow (1877), which has "let us have a tale of elves that ride by night, with jingling reins, or gnomes of the mine" (cited after OED).

The Russian  composer Mussorgsky  produced a movement in his work Pictures at an Exhibition, (1874)  named "Gnomus" (Latin for "The Gnome"). It  is written to sound as if a gnome is moving about.

Franz Hartmann in 1895 satirized materialism in an allegorical tale entitled Unter den Gnomen im Untersberg. The English translation appeared in 1896 as Among the Gnomes: An Occult Tale of Adventure in the Untersberg. In this story, the Gnomes are still clearly subterranean creatures, guarding treasures of gold within the Untersberg mountain.

As a figure of 19th-century fairy tales, the term gnome became largely synonymous with other terms for "little people" by the 20th century, such as goblin, brownie, leprechaun and other instances of the household spirit type, losing its strict association with earth or the underground world.

Modern fantasy literature
 Creatures called gnomes have been used in the fantasy genre of fiction and later gaming since the mid-nineteenth century, typically in a cunning role, e.g. as an inventor.
 In L. Frank Baum's Oz books (published 1900 to 1920), the Nomes (so spelled), especially their king, are the chief adversaries of the Oz people. They are ugly, hot-tempered, immortal, round-bodied creatures with spindly limbs, long beards and wild hair, militantly collecting and protecting jewels and precious metals underground. Ruth Plumly Thompson, who continued the series (1921 to 1976) after Baum's death, reverted to the traditional spelling. He also featured gnomes in his book The Life and Adventures of Santa Claus. They watch over the rocks, their king is part of the Council of Immortals, and they created the sleigh bells for Santa Claus's reindeer.
 J. R. R. Tolkien, in the legendarium (created 1914 to 1973) surrounding his Elves, uses "Gnomes" as the initial, but later dropped, name of the Noldor, the most gifted and technologically minded of his elvish races, in conscious exploitation of the similarity with the word gnomic. Gnome is thus Tolkien's English loan-translation of the Quenya word Noldo (plural Noldor), "those with knowledge". Tolkien's "Gnomes" are generally tall, beautiful, dark-haired, light-skinned, immortal, and wise. They are also proud, violent, and unduly admire their own creations, particularly their gemstones. Many live in cities below ground (Nargothrond) or in secluded mountain fortresses (Gondolin). He uses "Gnomes" to refer to both males and females. In The Father Christmas Letters (between 1920 and 1942), which Tolkien wrote for his children, Red Gnomes are presented as helpful creatures who come from Norway to the North Pole to assist Father Christmas and his Elves in fighting the wicked Goblins.
 BB's The Little Grey Men (1942) is a story of the last gnomes in England, little wild men who live by hunting and fishing.
 In C. S. Lewis's The Chronicles of Narnia (created 1950 to 1956), the gnomes are sometimes called "Earthmen". They live in the Underland, a series of caverns. Unlike the traditional, more human-like gnomes, they can have a wide variety of physical features and skin colours where some of them are either standing at 1 ft or being taller than humans. They are used as slaves by the Lady of the Green Kirtle until her defeat, at which point they return to their true home, the much deeper (and hotter) underground realm of Bism.
 The Dutch books Gnomes (1976) and The Secret Book of Gnomes (1984), written by Wil Huygen, deal with gnomes living together in harmony. These same books are the basis for a made-for-TV animated film and the Spanish-animated series The World of David the Gnome (as well as the spin-off Wisdom of the Gnomes). The word "gnome", in this case, is used in place of the Dutch kabouter.
 In the Warcraft franchise (1994 to present), particularly as featured in the massively multiplayer online role-playing game World of Warcraft, gnomes are a race of beings separate from but allied to dwarves and humans, with whom they share the lands of the Eastern Kingdoms. Crafty, intelligent, and smaller than their dwarven brethren, gnomes are one of two races in Azeroth regarded as technologically savvy. It is suggested in lore that the gnomes originally were mechanical creations that at some point became organic lifeforms. In World of Warcraft, gnomes are an exile race, having irradiated their home city of Gnomeregan in an unsuccessful last-ditch effort to drive out marauding foes.
 In J. K. Rowling's Harry Potter series (created 1997 to 2007), gnomes are pests that inhabit the gardens of witches and wizards. They are small creatures with heads that look like potatoes on small stubby bodies. Gnomes are generally considered harmless but mischievous and may bite with sharp teeth. In the books, it is stated that the Weasleys are lenient to gnomes, and tolerate their presence, preferring to throw them out of the garden rather than more extreme measures.
 In A. Yoshinobu’s Sorcerous Stabber Orphen, the European concept of a gnome is used in order to introduce the Far Eastern notion of the Koropokkuru,  a mythical indigenous race of small people: gnomes are a prosecuted minority banned from learning wizardry and attending magical schools.
 In Terry Brooks' Shannara series (created 1977 to 2017), gnomes are an offshoot race created after the Great Wars. There are several distinctive classes of gnomes. Gnomes are the smallest race. In The Sword of Shannara they are considered to be tribal and warlike, the one race that can be the most easily subverted to an evil cause. This is evidenced by their allegiance to the Warlock Lord in The Sword of Shannara and to the Mord Wraiths in The Wishsong of Shannara.
 Terry Pratchett included gnomes in his Discworld series. Gnomes were six inches in height but quite strong, often inflicting pain upon anyone underestimating them. One prominent gnome became a Watchman in Ankh-Morpork as the force became more diversified under the command of Sam Vimes, with Buggy Swires appearing in Jingo. Another gnome in the series was Wee Mad Arthur a pest terminator in Feet of Clay.

Music

 One of the first movements in Mussorgsky's 1874 work Pictures at an Exhibition is named "Gnomus" (Latin for "The Gnome"). It is written to sound as if a gnome is moving about, his movements constantly changing in speed.

 "The Laughing Gnome" is a song by English musician David Bowie, released as a single in 1967. It became a hit when reissued in 1973, in the wake of Bowie's commercial success.
 The 1970 album All Things Must Pass by English musician George Harrison has a cover image of the musician sitting among a group of garden gnomes.
 "The Gnome" is a song by Pink Floyd on their 1967 album The Piper at the Gates of Dawn. It is about a gnome named Grimble Gromble.

Games
 In the Dungeons & Dragons fantasy role-playing game, gnomes are one of the core races available for play as player characters. They are described as being smaller than dwarves and large-nosed. They have an affinity with small animals and a particular interest in gemstones. Depending on setting and subrace, they may also have a natural skill with illusion magic or engineering.

Movies 

The 1967 Walt Disney movie The Gnome-Mobile

The 2011 animated movie Gnomeo & Juliet

The 2018 animated movie Sherlock Gnomes featured gnomish versions of several classic Sherlock Holmes characters.

Derivative uses

Garden gnomes

After World War II (with early references, in ironic use, from the late 1930s) the diminutive figurines introduced as lawn ornaments during the 19th century came to be known as garden gnomes. The image of the gnome changed further during the 1960s to 1970s, when the first plastic garden gnomes were manufactured. These gnomes followed the style of the 1937 depiction of the seven dwarves in Snow White and the Seven Dwarfs by Disney. This "Disneyfied" image of the gnome was built upon by the illustrated children's book classic The Secret Book of Gnomes (1976), in the original Dutch Leven en werken van de Kabouter. Garden gnomes share a resemblance to the Scandinavian tomte and nisse, and the Swedish term "tomte" can be translated as "gnome" in English.

Gnome-themed parks

Several gnome themed entertainment parks exist. Notable ones are:
 The Gnome Reserve, at West Putford near Bradworthy in North Devon, United Kingdom
 Gnomeland, at Watermouth Castle in Berrynarbor, North Devon, United Kingdom
 Gnome Magic Garden, at Colchester, United Kingdom
Gnome Park, in Dawson, Minnesota, United States
 The Gnome Village, at Efteling theme park in Kaatsheuvel, Netherlands
 Zwergen-Park Trusetal, in Trusetal, Germany
Gnom's Park in Nowa Sól, Poland.

Gnome parades
Gnome parades are held annually at Atlanta's Inman Park Festival. Numerous one-off gnome parades have been held, including in Savannah, Georgia (April 2012) and Cleveland, Ohio (May 2011).

Metaphorical uses
 The expression "Gnomes of Zürich", Swiss bankers pictured as diminutive creatures hoarding gold in subterranean vaults, was derived from a speech in 1956 by Harold Wilson, and gained currency in the 1960s (OED notes the New Statesman issue of 27 November 1964 as earliest attestation).
 Architect Earl Young built a number of stone houses in Charlevoix, Michigan, that have been referred to as gnome homes.
 A user of Wikipedia or any wiki who makes useful incremental edits without clamouring for attention is called a WikiGnome.

See also

 Erdgeist
 Garden hermit
 Gnome (Dungeons & Dragons)
 Wrocław's dwarfs
 Travelling gnome

References

 
16th-century introductions
Earth spirits
Elementals
Mining folklore
Household deities
Fairy tale stock characters